This is a list of members of the Queensland Legislative Council from its creation on 1 May 1860 to 31 December 1869. Appointments, made by the Governor of Queensland, were for life, although many members for one reason or another resigned. Prior to 1860, Queensland was part of the colony of New South Wales.

Starting with 11 members, by 26 April 1861, the council had increased to 21 members. From then until the end of the decade, the mean membership was slightly over 20, ranging from 16–17 for a period from July 1865 to February 1866, to 23–24 for a period from July 1863 to April 1864.

Office bearers

President of the Legislative Council:
 Charles Nicholson (22 May 1860 – 26 August 1860)
 Maurice Charles O'Connell (26 August 1860 – 23 March 1879)

Chairman of Committees:
 Daniel Foley Roberts (30 May 1860 – 26 July 1889)

Members
The following members served in the Legislative Council between 1860 and 1869:

References

 Waterson, Duncan Bruce: Biographical Register of the Queensland Parliament 1860–1929 (second edition), Sydney 2001.

Members of Queensland parliaments by term
19th-century Australian politicians